My Grandmother Ironed the King's Shirts is a 1999 animated short by Torill Kove. Co-produced by Marcy Page of the National Film Board of Canada and Lars Tømmerbakke of Studio Magica in Norway, the film humorously recounts a tall tale about the filmmaker's grandmother in Oslo, Norway, during World War II, who actually ironed the shirts for Norway's King Haakon VII for many years.

My Grandmother Ironed the King's Shirts was Kove's first film with the NFB. It began as a screenwriting exercise for a class at Concordia University, where Kove had been enrolled. She then pitched the film to producers at the NFB, including its eventual NFB producer, Page. As is the case with her subsequent animated shorts, the musical score for My Grandmother Ironed the King's Shirts was composed by Kove's husband, Kevin Dean. The film is narrated by Mag Ruffman.

Reception
Awards for the film included a special prize from the Hiroshima International Animation Festival and a Golden Sheaf Award for best Animation. The film was also nominated for an Academy Award for Best Animated Short Film at the 72nd Academy Awards. It was also included in the Animation Show of Shows.

Adaptation
In May 2017, the NFB and Canadian publisher Firefly Books announced that the film would be adapted into a children's book.

References

External links

Watch My Grandmother Ironed the King's Shirts at NFB.ca

1999 films
National Film Board of Canada animated short films
Films directed by Torill Kove
Canadian World War II films
Norwegian animated short films
Canadian comedy short films
1990s animated short films
1999 animated films
Norwegian comedy films
1990s English-language films
Norwegian World War II films
1990s Canadian films